The Arkansas Valley National Bank, constructed in 1902, is a two-story, 30 feet x 90 feet sandstone structure located in Pawnee, Oklahoma. Constructed in a Late Victorian architectural style, it was Pawnee's original bank. When the building opened, the bank occupied the first floor, while a doctor, photographer, and local telephone office occupied the second floor. The bank closed around 1918, and the building has served as various storefronts since.

Originally the bank was to be called the Pawnee County Bank, and this name is engraved on the east wall; however it was chartered as the Arkansas Valley National Bank. It was listed on the National Register of Historic Places in 1978.

The building's facade was heavily damaged in a 5.8-magnitude earthquake on September 3, 2016.

References

Buildings and structures in Pawnee County, Oklahoma
Commercial buildings completed in 1902
Pawnee, Oklahoma
National Register of Historic Places in Pawnee County, Oklahoma
Bank buildings on the National Register of Historic Places in Oklahoma